92.1 Fuzz Fest was a small music festival in Scranton, Pennsylvania held at the Toyota Pavilion at Montage Mountain. The event was hosted by local radio station Fuzz 92.1 and was created to raise awareness of genres and styles of music that the general public might not be accustomed with. The festival featured both local bands and nationally known acts, and also features food and crafts from local vendors.

2016 Lineup
 Weezer
 Panic! at the Disco
  Andrew McMahon in the Wilderness
 AWOLNATION

2015 Lineup
  WALK THE MOON
  Bleachers
 Matt and Kim
  Andrew McMahon in the Wilderness
 The Mowgli's
 The Griswolds
 @Tabletalkband

2014 Lineup
 Cage the Elephant
 Kongos
 SKATERS
 Brick+Mortar
 The Unlikely Candidates
 Northern Faces
 Graces Downfall

2013 Lineup
 The Dirty Heads
 The Unlikely Candidates
 Robert DeLong
 Graces Downfall

References

External links

Music festivals in Pennsylvania
Tourist attractions in Scranton, Pennsylvania
Music festivals established in 2013
Rock festivals in the United States
2013 establishments in Pennsylvania